was one of the first shōjo magazines in Japan. It was published by Hakubunkan beginning in 1906 and was initially edited by renowned children′s author , better known by the pen name .

The magazine's early fiction output tended to be of a didactic nature, with tales about self-sacrifice and the importance of obeying one's parents. The stories then started to focus on passionate bonds between girls, often featuring tones typical of the Class S genre. 

According to Kiyoko Nagai, for the first ten years of its publication it was the best-selling shōjo magazine of the time, with peak circulations somewhere between 150,000 and 200,000 copies per issue.

The final issue of Shōjo Sekai was the December 1931 issue.

Contributors
Shōjo Sekai had a number of well known contributors over the years, including the following:
Sazanami Iwaya (:ja:巌谷小波), author, children's author, editor, publisher
Yasunari Kawabata, novelist and short story author
Chiyo Kitagawa, children's author
Tama Morita, essayist
Midori Osaki (:ja:尾崎翠), novelist
Kikuko Oshima, author
Akiko Yosano, poet, feminist, pacifist, and social reformer
Nobuko Yoshiya, author

References

External links

1906 establishments in Japan
1931 disestablishments in Japan
Children's magazines published in Japan
Defunct literary magazines published in Japan
Magazines established in 1906
Magazines disestablished in 1931
Magazines published in Tokyo
Shōjo manga